Batory High School is a public secondary school founded on 1 September 1918 and located at 6 Myśliwiecka Street in Warsaw, Poland. It is one of the best and most prestigious high schools in Poland. Famous alumni include among others composer Witold Lutosławski and poet and Home Army soldier Krzysztof Kamil Baczyński, killed during the Warsaw Uprising.

The school offers subject-profiled classes taught both in Polish and English. Enhanced education in mathematics, physics, biology, chemistry, humanities (languages and history) and geography is provided. Since 2005, the school offers the two-year IB program intended for students aged 16–19.

History 
The school's history starts with the founding of the Stefan Batory Gymnasium (now called Lyceum) on 1 September 1918 with Zdzisław Rudzki as its first headmaster. It was originally located at 21 Kapucyńska Street. Construction of the current premises, the work of the eminent architect and urbanist Prof. Tadeusz Tołwiński, started in 1922 and was completed in September 1924. The school was equipped with exceptionally modern learning facilities and science labs, an astronomical observatory (now closed), an underground swimming pool, and botanical garden. The teaching staff was composed of distinguished teachers like Stanisław Młodożeńiec, Stanisław Arnold, Stanisław Malec, Gustaw Wuttke, Adam Zieleńczyk to name just a few.

At the outset of the World War II, during German invasion of Poland in September 1939, the school served as field hospital, supporting the nearby Ujazdowski Hospital. During the German occupation of Poland (1939–1945) the school's buildings were requisitioned and hosted German primary and secondary school. Its opening was attended by Governor General Hans Frank. Throughout the occupation period Stefan Batory Gymnasium teachers organized underground education for its students.

In the post World War II period the name of the school was changed to Stefan Batory Lyceum (full Polish name - II Liceum Ogółnokształcące im. Stefana Batorego w Warszawie).

In 1996, during a visit to Poland, the school was visited by Queen Elizabeth II and in 1997, the school was visited by Michael Jackson.

In 2017, a team from the school became the first from Poland to win a title (in the Varsity Bowl Division) in the International History Bee and Bowl European Championships, which were held in Rome that year.

Notable alumni 
The following list is based on the list provided on the website of the school who have Wikipedia pages about them, historian and alumni information:
 Witold Wincenty Staniszkis (1926) - hydro engineer, scholar, politician, father of Jadwiga Staniszkis
Witold Lutosławski (1931) - composer
Krzysztof Kamil Baczyński (1939) - poet, Home Army (Armia Krajowa) soldier 
Jan Bytnar (Rudy) (1939) - WW2 resistance hero
Tadeusz Zawadzki (Zoska) (1939) - WW2 resistance hero
Agnieszka Holland (1966) - director
 Ewa Bem (1969) - singer 
Marian Danysz - physicist
Andrzej Łapicki - actor
Agnieszka Wagner - actress
Andrzej Ciechanowiecki - art historian and patron
Piotr Słonimski - geneticist, pioneer of yeast mitochondrial genetics
Henry Millicer - aircraft designer and pilot
Maciej Nowicki - architect
Jerzy Kroh - chemist
Adam Galos - historian
Jan Nowak-Jeziorański - “Courier from Warsaw”, remembered for his work as an emissary  shuttling between the commanders of the Home Army and the Polish Government in Exile
Michał Matczak (Mata) - rapper

References 

1918 establishments in Poland
Schools in Warsaw
Educational institutions established in 1918